Cranberry Portage station is a station located in Cranberry Portage in Manitoba, Canada which is west of Grass River Provincial Park in north-central Manitoba. The station is served by Via Rail's "The Pas-Pukatawagan" line for the Keewatin Railway twice per week in each direction.

The station building was built in 1929 as a two-storey third class station by the Canadian National Railway. The railway station was designated a historic site in 1992.

The building is now home to the Cranberry Portage Heritage Museum.

See also

 List of designated heritage railway stations of Canada

References

External links
Cranberry Portage Heritage Museum - Building Acquisition

Via Rail stations in Manitoba
Designated Heritage Railway Stations in Manitoba
Railway stations in Canada opened in 1929
1929 establishments in Manitoba
Municipal Heritage Sites in Manitoba
Canadian Register of Historic Places in Manitoba